The 1910 Kilkenny Senior Hurling Championship was the 22nd staging of the Kilkenny Senior Hurling Championship since its establishment by the Kilkenny County Board.

On 30 April 1911, Tullaroan won the championship after a 7-01 to 3-00 defeat of Piltown in the final. This was their 10th championship title overall and their first in three championship seasons.

Results

Final

References

Kilkenny Senior Hurling Championship
Kilkenny Senior Hurling Championship